Esperanza (English: Hope) is a 2011 Chilean telenovela produced and broadcast by TVN.

Cast
 Daniela Ramírez as Esperanza Reyes Varela.
 Alvaro Escobar as Juan Pablo Marticorena.
 Íngrid Cruz as Beatriz Solovera Vergara.
 José Martínez as Elías Rocco Salazar.
 Patricio Achurra as Génaro Solovera.
 Schlomit Baytelman as Trinidad Vergara.
 Osvaldo Silva as Ulises Leighton Villanueva.
 Teresita Reyes as Carmen Salazar.
 Erto Pantoja as Anselmo Quispe.
 Lorena Capetillo as Susana Farías.
 Marcelo Valdivieso as Héctor "Tito" Arguedas.
 Claudio González as Luis Reyes.
 Victor Montero as Jesús Vargas.
 Matías López as Ignacio Marticorena.
 Patricio Ossa as Ariel Reyes Reyes / Ariel Marticorena Reyes.
 Sebastián Gallardo as Rodrigo Marticorena Solovera.
 Max Meriño as Doctor Arrau.
 María José León as Cristina Salvatierra.
 Otilio Castro as Samuel Carrillo.
 Elvira Cristi as Bernardita Guzmán.
 Casandra Montt as Vilma, secretary of Juan Pablo.
 María Luisa Mayol as Dolores "Luly" Fernandez.
 Rodrigo Riffo Carrasco as Diego
 Verónica Moraga as Elvira.
 Simoney Romero as Mayra.
 Ernesto Gutiérrez as Camionero que ayuda a Ariel.
 Laura Olazábal as Mercedes, mother of Esperanza
 Max Meriño as Doctor Arrau

References

External links

2011 telenovelas
2011 Chilean television series debuts
2012 Chilean television series endings
Chilean telenovelas
Spanish-language telenovelas
Televisión Nacional de Chile telenovelas